{{Infobox television
| image                = La fea más bella poster.jpg
| image_size           = 250
| image_alt            =
| caption              = 
| alt_name             = 
| genre                = TelenovelaComedy
| creator              = Fernando Gaitán
| based_on             = 
| developer            = 
| writer               = Palmira Olguín
| director             = 
| creative_director    = 
| presenter            = 
| starring             = 
| judges               = 
| voices               = 
| narrated             = 
| theme_music_composer = 
| opentheme            = 
| endtheme             = 
| composer             = 
| country              = Mexico
| language             = Spanish
| num_seasons          = 
| num_episodes         = 300
| list_episodes        = 
| executive_producer   = Rosy Ocampo
| producer             = 
| editor               = 
| location             = 
| cinematography       = 
| camera               = 
| runtime              = 42-45 minutes
| company              = 
| distributor          = 
| channel              = Canal de las Estrellas
| picture_format       = HDTV 1080i
| audio_format         = 
| first_aired          = 
| last_aired           = 
| preceded_by          = Buenas Tardes (18:00)Barrera de amor (20:00)Rebelde (19:00)
| followed_by          = Buenas Tardes (16:00)Rebelde (18:00)Barrera de amor (19:00)Amor mío (20:00)Yo amo a Juan Querendón (20:30)| related              = Betty la fea (1999) 
}}La Fea Más Bella ("The Prettiest Ugly Girl or the ugliest the most beautiful “) is a Mexican telenovela produced by Televisa. It is the second Mexican version of the popular Colombian telenovela: Betty la fea (the first is Azteca Trece's El amor no es como lo pintan, aired in 2000).

 Plot Letty is the protagonist of La Fea Más Bella (The Most Beautiful Ugly Girl), and as the title suggests, she is not particularly good-looking. The story begins with her going to an interview at Conceptos, a famous Mexican modeling and advertising company, and being turned down for the job because of her appearance. The president of the company, Fernando Mendiola, however, calls her back. Though he is initially shocked at her appearance, he decides to hire her since she is obviously overqualified for the job. After receiving the job from an uncertain president, Letty tries to prove herself with the help of The Club of the Uglies or The Ugly Club (El Club de las Feas). She becomes Fernando's right hand, and soon develops a crush on him even though he is a womanizer and engaged to Marcia Villaroel. She is completely loyal to him and would do whatever he needed her to do. Fernando, knowing this, asks that she help him create a false company to put Conceptos in debt as opposed to the banks. Lety does as he asks, and this secret stays between her, Fernando, and the vice president, Omar Carvajal.

In order to keep up with the false company, Lety hires her best friend, Tomas Mora. Tomas is equally as ugly as she is, and they are like brother and sister. However, in order to keep her crush on Fernando a secret from her friends, she claims that Tomas is her secret crush. Fernando and Omar find out that Lety put Tomas in charge of finances of the false company, and then hear from her friends that she is in love with Tomas. Omar convinces Fernando that he needs to make Lety fall in love with him so that Lety won't hand over the company to Tomas out of love. Fernando begrudgingly agrees, but he feels guilt over tricking the person who always has his best interest at heart, as well as disgust at the thought of having to seduce Lety. Lety is completely surprised over the attention and affection that Fernando gives her, and although she is scared to love him she can't help it. Fernando feels like a disgrace because Lety is so good, and she gives herself to him, and he finds out that the only other love that Lety has felt before was also fake and due to a bet that some of the mean neighbors that she had. Though Fernando has been with plenty of women, he has never felt so loved and cared for her, and he soon starts falling in love with Lety.  Marcia and Omar eventually leave to Germany for a work trip, and during their leave Fernando and Lety are in their little world. Then Lety discovers the truth behind their love.

Lety finds a letter written by Vice-President Omar Carvajal. The letter is a joke from Carvajal to Fernando teasing him about his bravery for seducing the ugly girl in order to protect the fate of Conceptos. Angered and broken-hearted by this, Letty uses the contents to her advantage. She makes Fernando scared by pretending to give Tomas romantic attention (in reality, Fernando feels jealousy more than fear for the company). However, Lety decides to end the game as no matter what she tries to do to hurt Fernando ends up hurting her as well, and after hearing that Omar and Fernando want to send her out of the country when they finish using her, she presents the letter at a quarterly meeting to Omar and Fernando and reveals the true financial state of affairs of the company to the company's council and former owners. They find out that she actually owns Conceptos herself through a dummy company, Filmo Imagen. She resigns from her job during the meeting, leaving signed documents so that she has nothing to do with the company, and runs away to Acapulco with a friend named Carolina Ángeles who hires her for work.

There, she meets a part-time fisherman and chef named Aldo Domenzaín, who saves her (literally) and helps her realize her true potential. Fernando is devastated when she leaves, and loses a part of himself. He obsesses over her, wondering where she left to and if she will come back. Lety is adamant about not wanting anything to do with Conceptos, but she eventually has to come home and is forced by her father to fix the mistakes that she and Fernando made. When she returns to Conceptos as the full owner of it, she realizes she must  get the company back to its former glory so she can finally leave for good without a guilty conscience. Aldo follows her home with the hope of winning her love, but struggles because Fernando refuses to give her up so easily. Fernando continues a relationship with Marcia, but only because he is not sure that Lety will accept him. He struggles in trying to convince her that he was really in love with her despite what the letter said, but Lety will not allow herself to believe him. She continues to love him, but she feels so betrayed by him that she ignores her feelings towards him.
Eventually, Fernando feels so frustrated at not being able to convince Lety of his true love and that his presence bothers almost everyone that he decides to resign so that Lety and the rest of Conceptos can move forward. In doing this, Fernando's mother convinces Marcia to tell the truth to Lety: Fernando fell in love with her and is still in love with her. Marcia reluctantly tells Lety the truth so that she and Fernando can make up and continue to work as the best team conceptos has in order to make the company succeed again (this to honor the memory the Villaroel family, the co-founders). Lety and Fernando finally reunite and embrace, but just as they start to move towards their fairy tale ending, Aldo appears and Lety realizes that she also loves him. 

Through this all, Lety undergoes a dramatic appearance change, visits the wedding of a long-time enemy and a long-time friend, and acts on a television show dressed as a diva. Fernando has been suffering from his own transformation as he realizes the error of his womanizing ways and tries to convince Letty that he really did love her. He breaks up with Marcia for good, becomes Lety's assistant as a sort of penance and to show his father he's serious about his work. Lety's indecisiveness comes to an end as she realizes that though she loves both, Aldo has never hurt her, and most likely will never hurt her. Lety prepares for her wedding with Aldo, and things seem to finally be winding to a close with Conceptos, financially (she puts Marcia in charge of the company because Marcia deserves the title for her hard work). However, when Fernando decides to go to Brazil, a way of running away from a world where the love of his life is with someone else, Letty realizes that the man she really loves, and wants to marry, is Fernando (and surprisingly enough, Aldo seems to be alright with that). The story ends with Fernando taking Aldo's place and the wedding and he and Lety marry, realizing that Aldo was an angel who helped them get back together.

Cast

Audience

Mexico 
La Fea Más Bella was the soap opera with the most watched finale in the history of Mexico, with a growing audience. In his last chapter, the audience of 43 points (62.8 nationally) overcame the transmission of Oscar 2007 with 9 points (14.9 in every country), displayed at the same time by TV Azteca. In an unprecedented end on a Sunday, lasting three hours. Was considered the best television series in 2007 due to its good ratings, which were not affected even after the extension of the novel. His first came from redisplay by March 2007 and again on July 14, 2014, replacing the rerun of Soy tu dueña. The last episode was broadcast on March 7, 2015 with Rubí replacing one half-hour it on March 9, 2015.

United States 
Also achieved ratings success in the United States, constantly won the WB and UPN stations, displayed on the Spanish channel but seen in the country, Univision (3 million viewers), which at the time managed to defeat the CBS, NBC and ABC respectively, with the exception of Fox and the "America's Got Talent" on NBC. Came to get 21.3 points (4.6 million) and then 25.3 points. With 7.4 million viewers an episode, was the 15th most watched program in the country, in addition to achieving 4th position nationwide audience, then the 2nd, becoming the most watched soap opera in the Nielsen rankings. Univision broadcast 2 hour episodes of La Fea Más Bella weekday at 12md/11c from September 13, 2010, to April 15, 2011 .

Filming 

Tapings of La fea más bella began on December 9, 2005 at Televisa San Ángel. Jaime Camil had to abandon his role in a Broadway play to record the show. Angélica Vale needed to lose weight 20 kilos to play the role of Lety. The tapings lasted about 8 hours but reached up to 18 hours daily, which was extended for 14 months. Beside the Banda El Recodo, Vale recorded a music video for the theme "El club de las feas" in a well known restaurant in Mexico City.

During the month of July 2006, Televisa hosted events during the FIFA World Cup in Germany, for which several actors from the cast traveled to record some scenes from the soap opera, and presented a show before 15,000 people.

Problems 
Angélica Vale had an infection caused by salmonella that made her cancel a promotional trip to New York City. In recording a scene where she throws plates and glasses, the actress cut her finger and needed to rebuild 70% of the tendon of her left hand, which prevented her from returning to the studio for three weeks.

Vale suffered from fatigue in during filming. "She didn't faint, but she was very sick. She was overwhelmed by the job since the show records on Sunday and she had little time to rest. She already had chronic fatigue," said her mother, actress Angélica Maria.

In January 2007, Vale again underwent medical treatment and was diagnosed with typhoid, for which she needed a strong antibiotic and rest.

DVD releases 
La Fea Más Bella was released in stores and online on February 19, 2008 In just short version, consisting of 14 chapters, with durations ranging from 1 hour to 1 hour and 30 minutes to about 700 minutes total in 3 DVD. Another version, also edited, was launched with an additional 250 minutes over the previous version, distributed on 4 DVD.

Reception 
With the success of audience in Mexico, was the version that drew the most critical attention. In the United States, Angélica Vale, characterized as Letty, made a cameo on Ugly Betty as a secretary in the North American Betty consulting dentist. In Brazil, besides being exhibited by SBT in 2006 and again in 2014, reaching record audiences, Rede Record produced in an inspired plot that was titled "Bela, a feia" ("Beauty, the ugly"). In 2009 it was dubbed into Arabic and aired on MTV Lebanon as Letty instead of La Fea Más Bella.

Awards and nominations

Soundtrack

The soundtrack of La fea más bella was released in two separate volumes, one only digital format released on February 14, 2006 by Warner Music Mexico and other in physical format (CD) and digital on June 6 plumb the year by EMI Televisa Music.

Track listing

References

External links 

 Official website
 La Fea mas Bella en Univision.com
 La Fea Mas Bella en Canal RCN

Yo soy Betty, la fea
2006 telenovelas
2006 Mexican television series debuts
2007 Mexican television series endings
Mexican telenovelas
Televisa telenovelas
Comedy telenovelas
Mexican television series based on Colombian television series
Spanish-language telenovelas
Fashion-themed television series